The MAI-223 Kityonok is a single-engine STOL ultralight aircraft developed by the Moscow Aviation Institute's special design bureau (OSKBEC) from 2002.  The first production aircraft was delivered in 2008.  A crop spraying version is under development. The aircraft is supplied as a kit for amateur construction or complete and ready-to-fly.

Design and development

The Kityonok is a parasol winged, conventionally laid-out ultralight which seats two side by side. The parasol configuration was used to increase wing lifting area to improve STOL performance. Though the prototype had a partly fabric-covered fuselage, later Kityonoks have glass fibre skins everywhere except for control surfaces.  The fuselage has an aluminium frame, and the wings have aluminium alloy ribs. The constant-chord wings are swept forward at about 4°, with 3° of dihedral and mount electrically operated flaps.  The wings are braced with a V-form pair of lift struts on each side, fixed to the lower fuselage close to the engine mounting and assisted by jury struts.  The centre section loads are carried by a centre-line pair of faired cabane struts.  The wings can be folded for storage.  The tailplane is trapezoidal and set at the top of the fuselage; there is an electrically operated trim tab on the port elevator.  The rudder has a ground-adjustable tab.

The Kityonok is normally powered by a 73.5 kW (98.6 hp) Rotax 912 ULS flat-four engine driving a three-bladed propeller, though the lower-powered Rotax 503UL or 582 UL are options. Access to the cabin is via two deep, glazed doors. The Kityonok has a conventional undercarriage with main wheels on backward-leaning cantilever legs mounted on torsion bars in the lower fuselage. The mainwheels have hydraulic brakes, and the tailwheel casters.  Alternatively it can be equipped with skis or floats.

Two production batches of 10 were begun in 2006, on by MAI and one by PRAD.  Plans were announced that year for production of the MAI-223SKh crop sprayer version at UZGA (The Ural Works of Civil Aviation) at Ekaterinburg.  4 Kityonoks had been completed by 2009.  Though it was intended to produce kits for home building as well as ready-to-fly aircraft, it is not known if any have been made.

Operational history
The third prototype/first production aircraft was delivered to the Tomsk Aero Club in 2008.

Variants
Data from Jane's all the World's Aircraft 2011/12
MAI-223
Base version
MAI-223SKh
 Crop sprayer, announced 2006, first flight 31 August 2007. Can carry up to 160 L (42.2 US gal; 35.2 Imp gal) of chemicals distributed via an 8.56 m (28 ft 1 in) spray bar extending beyond the wings.
MAI-208
 Autogyro based on MAI-223 fuselage.

Specifications

See also

References

External links

 MAI-223 Kityonok at Jane's All the World's Aircraft

Agricultural aircraft
2000s Russian ultralight aircraft
Parasol-wing aircraft
Single-engined tractor aircraft
Aircraft first flown in 2004